Colin McKenzie may refer to:

Death of Sergeant Colin McKenzie
Colin McKenzie (cricketer) (1880–1930), Australian cricketer
Colin Campbell McKenzie (1836–1899), member of the Legislative Assembly of British Columbia
Colin McKenzie (rugby union) (born 1964), Canadian rugby union player
Colin McKenzie, character in mockumentary Forgotten Silver

See also
Colin Mackenzie (disambiguation)